Suzanne Mukayijore is a Rwandan politician from the Liberal Party. She represents the Northern Province in the Chamber of Deputies.

References 

Year of birth missing (living people)
Living people
21st-century Rwandan politicians
21st-century Rwandan women politicians
Members of the Chamber of Deputies (Rwanda)
People from Northern Province, Rwanda
Liberal Party (Rwanda) politicians
Members of the Pan-African Parliament from Rwanda